Matthew Wallace (born October 24, 1995) is an American professional stock car racing driver. He is a member of the Wallace family, which includes his father Mike and uncles Rusty and Kenny, each former NASCAR drivers who successfully competed in the sport for decades. His sister Chrissy and cousin Steve have both also had careers in NASCAR.

Career

ARCA Racing Series

Matt made his debut in stock cars in the ARCA race at Toledo Speedway, driving the No. 69 for Kimmel Racing, where he would go on to finish tenth in that race. Mike Wallace was friends with team owner Bill Kimmel, which is how the deal was put together for Matt to race for Kimmel's ARCA team. It was later revealed that he would return to the same car at IRP in July.

Matt Wallace tested at ARCA's Daytona test session in January 2016 leading up to the race at the track in February. He drove the No. 22 Dodge for Cunningham Motorsports, sharing the car in the session with Kevin Thomas Jr, who was set to be the full-time driver of that car for the 2016 season. However, Wallace's crew chief Paul Andrews did state that Cunningham would try to field an additional car for him at Daytona if sponsorship could be found (and it was not).

NASCAR Xfinity Series
On July 10, 2015, it was announced that Matt would make his debut in the Xfinity Series at the New Hampshire race later that month, driving for JGL Racing, the same team that his father Mike drove for in many races in 2014 as well as Daytona in 2015 and his uncle Kenny raced for earlier that year at Talladega. In addition, he was also scheduled to pilot the car at Iowa and other races yet to be determined, although he only ended up driving at Iowa.

Although he made his debut in the series in 2015, Matt Wallace did have a chance to do so one season earlier, as at the Daytona night race in 2014. Mike Wallace, JGL, and his sponsor for that race, Smith Transportation, agreed that if Mike got a top-5 finish, the team would give Matt one race in the team's No. 93 car and he could pick which one. Although his father did finish in the top-10 in the race, it was not a top-5, so Matt did not get to run for the team that year.

Late Model Racing
He has not made any NASCAR or ARCA starts since 2015, but he is still racing, competing in super late model events in the CARS Series, sometimes against his cousin Steve, who also now competes in CARS late models after competing full-time for several years in the Xfinity Series. In 2019, he launched his own driver development program to give other drivers an opportunity to compete in super late models as well. His father Mike and late model car builder Robert Hamke assisted Matt in this effort.

Personal life
He grew up in the Charlotte, North Carolina area (where the majority of race teams are based) although his family is from St. Louis. He started racing at age 8 in bandoleros. When he was 12 and 13, he raced legends cars, and then pro late models by the age of 14. When he made his debut in both ARCA and Xfinity in 2015, he was attending classes at Rowan-Cabarrus Community College, and expressed a desire to attend UNC-Charlotte after graduating from RCCC, studying business administration at both schools.

Motorsports career results

NASCAR
(key) (Bold – Pole position awarded by qualifying time. Italics – Pole position earned by points standings or practice time. * – Most laps led.)

Xfinity Series

 Season still in progress
 Ineligible for series points

ARCA Racing Series

References

External links
 
 

NASCAR drivers
ARCA Menards Series drivers
Living people
1995 births
Racing drivers from Missouri
Racing drivers from Charlotte, North Carolina
Racing drivers from North Carolina
Sportspeople from St. Louis
CARS Tour drivers
Wallace family